Mormopterus francoismoutoui is a species of free-tailed bat that is endemic to the island of Réunion, which is east of Madagascar.

Taxonomy
M. francoismoutoui was described as a new species in 2008.
The holotype had been collected in 2006 in the commune of La Possession on the island of Réunion.
The eponym for the species name "francoismoutoui " is biologist François Moutou.

Description

Range and habitat
M. francoismoutoui is found only on the island of Réunion.

Conservation
As of 2017, M. francoismoutoui is evaluated as a least-concern species by the IUCN—its lowest conservation priority.
It meets the criteria for this classification because it has numerous large roosts across the island. Additionally, no threats to the species are known.

References

Mammals described in 2008
Endemic fauna of Réunion
Mormopterus
Bats of Africa